Albert William "Snow" Bowman (5 May 1915 – 20 January 1992) was a New Zealand rugby union player. He was a member of the New Zealand national side, the All Blacks, on their 1938 tour of Australia. playing in six matches including three internationals.

Bowman died in Waipukurau on 20 January 1992, and his ashes were buried at Waipukurau Cemetery.

References

1915 births
1992 deaths
Rugby union players from Auckland
New Zealand rugby union players
New Zealand international rugby union players
Hawke's Bay rugby union players
Wellington rugby union players
Nelson rugby union players
Rugby union flankers
New Zealand military personnel of World War II